Bankstown Aerodrome is a suburb south-west of Sydney, in the state of New South Wales. The suburb was gazetted in May 1994 and is the location of the Bankstown Airport. The suburb is bounded by the Georges River in the west and Condell Park in the east.

References

Bankstown, New South Wales
Suburbs of Sydney